"Rhyacophiloidea" may also be the name of the entire "Spicipalpia", when these are treated as a superfamily inside the Annulipalpia.

The Rhyacophiloidea are a superfamily in the insect order Trichoptera.

References 

Insect superfamilies
Spicipalpia